Alby may refer to:

Places 
 Alby, Botkyrka, a suburb of Stockholm, Sweden
 Alby metro station
 Alby, Ånge, a locality in Västernorrland County, Sweden 
 Alby, Öland, a village in Hulterstad district, Sweden
 Alby, Norfolk, a settlement in Alby with Thwaite, a civil parish in Norfolk, England

People
 Alby (nickname)
 Alby Barlow (born 1916), Australian racing cyclist
 Alby James (born 1954), British theatre director
 Alby Saunders (born 1924), Australian racing cyclist
 Barbara Alby (1946–2012), American politician
 Henri Alby (1858–1935), French army general

Fictional characters
 Alby Grant, in the television show Big Love
 Alby, in the novel The Maze Runner

Other uses 
 Cyclone Alby, which caused widespread damage in Australia in 1978

See also
 Albi (disambiguation)
 Albie (disambiguation)
 Albysjön (disambiguation) (Swedish for "Lake Alby")